The Covenant Monument is a provincial heritage site in Belfast in the Mpumalanga province of South Africa.

In 1982 it was described in the Government Gazette as

References
 South African Heritage Resource Agency database

Monuments and memorials in South Africa
Buildings and structures in Mpumalanga